Kindon is a surname. Notable people with the surname include:

Christine Kindon (born 1949), British swimmer 
Steve Kindon (born 1950), British footballer